Pavel Timofeevich Lebeshev (15 February 1940, in Moscow – 23 February 2003, in Moscow) was a Soviet and Russian cinematographer. Pavel Lebeshev graduated from the Gerasimov Institute of Cinematography in 1972 and worked with many famous Soviet and Russian directors, including Nikita Mikhalkov, Georgi Daneliya  and Larisa Shepitko.

Selected filmography
Belorussian Station (1970); directed by Andrei Smirnov
At Home Among Strangers (1974); directed by Nikita Mikhalkov
A Slave of Love (1976); directed by Nikita Mikhalkov
The Ascent (1976); directed by Larisa Shepitko
An Unfinished Piece for a Player Piano (1976); directed by Nikita Mikhalkov
 Time for rest from Saturday to Monday (1984); directed by Igor Talankin
Kin-dza-dza! (1986); directed by Georgi Daneliya
Hard to Be a God (1989); directed by Peter Fleischmann
Anna: 6 - 18 (1993); directed by Nikita Mikhalkov
Nastya (1993); directed by Georgiy Daneliya
Prisoner of the Mountains (1996); directed by Sergei Bodrov
The Barber of Siberia (1998); directed by Nikita Mikhalkov
As Far as My Feet Will Carry Me (2001); directed by Hardy Martins

References

External links
 

1940 births
2003 deaths
Soviet cinematographers
Russian cinematographers
Gerasimov Institute of Cinematography alumni
Recipients of the Nika Award
Recipients of the Order "For Merit to the Fatherland", 3rd class
People's Artists of Russia
State Prize of the Russian Federation laureates
Burials at Kuntsevo Cemetery